PCaaS or, Personal Computer as a Service, is a Personal Computer hardware and optionally software leasing, licensing and delivery model in which personal computer and optionally software (particularly installed on the PC) are leased and licensed on a subscription basis. The subscription often includes services such as staging, imaging, maintenance, fix, logistics services and may also be bundled with help desk services, data backup and recovery.

There are several vendors that have PCaaS offerings including, Bizbang, Dell, HP (they call theirs Device as a Service), and Lenovo (in Australia only for now).

Computers